Aliabad-e Malek (also Romanized as ‘Alīābād-e Malek; also known as ‘Alīābād) is a village in Aliabad-e Malek Rural District, in the Central District of Arsanjan County, Fars Province, Iran. At the 2006 census, its population was 1,592, in 392 families.

References 

Populated places in Arsanjan County